The 1967 Tour de Suisse was the 31st edition of the Tour de Suisse cycle race and was held from 18 June to 23 June 1967. The race started and finished in Zürich. The race was won by Gianni Motta of the Molteni team.

General classification

References

1967
Tour de Suisse